Hollywood is one of three stations on Metra's BNSF Line in Brookfield, Illinois. In Metra's zone-based fare system, Hollywood is in zone C. As of 2018, Hollywood is the 181st busiest of Metra's 236 non-downtown stations, with an average of 120 weekday boardings. An unstaffed shelter is on the north side of the three tracks. 

Hollywood station is the main stop for the Brookfield Zoo. It was originally built in 1893 when Samuel Eberly Gross, a Chicago lawyer, began selling building lots platted from farms and woodlands he had acquired along both sides of the Chicago, Burlington & Quincy Railroad line. He did the same thing with the current Brookfield station in 1889,  and the former West Grossdale station in 1895.  All three developments built by Gross voted to be incorporated into the Village of Grossdale. After Gross divorced his first wife, married a teenager, filed for bankruptcy and moved to Michigan, the residents voted to change the name of the village to Brookfield as well as two of the stations in 1905. Hollywood station, however, kept its original name.

Bus connections
Pace

References

External links 

Station from Hollywood Avenue entrance from Google Maps Street View

Brookfield, Illinois
Metra stations in Illinois
Former Chicago, Burlington and Quincy Railroad stations
Railway stations in the United States opened in 1893
Railway stations in Cook County, Illinois